Na Hye-seok (28 April 1896 – 10 December 1948) was a Korean feminist, poet, writer, painter, educator, and journalist. Her pen name was Jeongwol. She was a pioneering Korean feminist writer and painter. She was the first female professional painter and the first feminist writer in Korea. She created some of the earliest Western-style paintings in Korea, and published feminist novels and short stories. She became well known as a feminist because of her criticism of the marital institution in the early 20th century.

Early life
Na Hye-seok was born into the Naju Na clan (나주 나씨, 羅州 羅氏), an aristocratic family, in 1896 in Suwon as the fourth child to Na Gi-jeong and Lady Choi Si-ui. She was called Na Ah-ji (나아지, 羅兒只) and Na Myeong-sun (나명순, 羅明順) in her childhood. Hyeseok is the name given to her when she started attending Jin Myeong Girl's High School. Na Hyeseok demonstrated her artistic talent from an early age and graduated at the top of her class at Jin Myeong Girl's High School in 1913.

Career
As a young woman, Na Hyeseok was known for her high spirits and outspokenness, making it clear she wanted to be a painter and an intellectual, rejecting the traditional "Good Wife, Wise Mother" archetype. Her major written work, Kyonghui, published in 1918, concerns a woman's self-discovery and her subsequent search for meaning in life as a "new woman;" it is the first feminist short story in Korean literature.

After her graduation from Jinmyeong Girls' High School in 1913, Na Hyeseok majored in Western oil painting at Tokyo Arts College. As a student, Na wrote several essays critiquing the standard "good wife, good mother" Korean archetype, saying she wanted a career as an artist. In April 1915, Na became the main organizer of the Association of Korean Women Students in Japan. It was around this time that she fell in love with Choe Sung-gu, a student at Keio University and the then editor and publisher of the magazine Hakchigwang. The relationship between Na and Choe was highly publicized among Korean students in Japan, as was Na's close literary and personal association with Yi Gwangsu. In the spring of 1915, Na's father summoned her back home and pressured her to accept a marriage proposal from a well-established family. Na was able to escape this by accepting a teaching position in a primary school, according to her later account. After a year of teaching and saving money for tuition, Na returned to Tokyo toward the end of 1915 to resume her studies. In April 1916, however, Choe Sung-gu died of tuberculosis, and Na had to temporarily stop her studies while recovering from a mental breakdown.

In 1919, she participated in the March 1st Movement against Japanese rule. She was jailed for this, and the lawyer hired by her family to represent her soon became her husband.

In 1920 Na Hyeseok, along with Kim Iryeop and ten men, established the literary magazine P-yeho. Early in the 1920s, both Kim and Na contributed a series of articles to the first magazine for Korean women, called Sinyoja, or "New Woman", on the subject of improving Korean women's clothing. They argued for a more functional and practical outfit for Korean women to help improve their hygiene, health, and self-image, and denounced traditional Korean dresses which were designed with no consideration for women's physical comfort, protection, and convenience.

On April 10, 1920, Na Hyeseok married Kim Woo-young, in Jeongdong wedding hall, Seoul. Theirs was a love marriage, rare at the time in Korea. On 18 March 1921, Na had her first exhibition of paintings and the first exhibition by a Korean woman painter ever in Seoul.  In 1923, Na attracted much attention for her essay "Thoughts on becoming a mother," in which she lashed out against her husband for leaving child-rearing entirely up to her.

In 1927 Na Hyeseok and her husband went on a three-year tour of Europe sponsored by the Japanese government, making her the first Korean woman to travel to Europe and America. While traveling around Europe, Na created paintings from her observances of European culture by carefully examining customs, arts, and family life, as well as exploring how women portrayed themselves. Following her return from abroad, Na continued to curate her art, holding an exhibition in her home town of Suwon in which she displayed both the art that completed in Europe as well as prints she had acquired throughout her travels.

Na studied painting in France while Kim had become a Japanese diplomat.  While in Paris, with her husband away, she is said to have engaged in an affair with Cheondo-gyo leader Choi Rin, which became fodder for gossip columnists. Na Hyeseok's husband divorced her on grounds of infidelity in 1931. It is not known whether she truly was unfaithful; her diary shows that up to her late 30s she tried hard to remain loyal to traditional Korean marital and maternal roles in spite of the many humiliations and frustrations of her unhappy marriage. In any case, she came to be thought of and stigmatized as a woman who used her artistic pretensions as an excuse for sexual abandon. In 1931 Na sued Choi in a French court for "defamation of a woman's reputation" after he published a salacious article recounting their affair.

Despite the divorce and disgraceful reputation, Na Hyeseok continued painting and won a special prize at the 10th Joseon Art Exhibition in 1931. She also published a piece called A Divorce Testimony in the magazine Samcheolli in 1934, raising issues with gender inequality endorsed by Korean morality and tradition. She challenged the patriarchal social system and male-oriented mentality of Korean society at the time. In A Divorce Testimony, Na criticized the repression of female sexuality; stated that her ex-husband had been unable to satisfy her sexually and refused to discuss the issue; and finally she advocated "test marriages" where a couple would live together before marrying to avoid a repeat of her unhappy marriage. It was A Divorce Testimony that ultimately ruined Na's career, as her views were regarded as scandalous and shocking, since traditional Korean Confucian culture considered premarital sex to be taboo and women were not to speak frankly of their sexuality. Unable to sell her paintings, essays, or stories, Na Hyeseok was reduced to destitution and spent her last years living on the charity of Buddhist monasteries. One consequence of this neglect has been that it is difficult today to verify what paintings are hers — although Na Hyeseok is now regarded as one of Korea's greatest painters, with her works selling for millions of won — and a number of fakes have appeared on the market.
  
She died on December 10, 1948 at a charity hospital. Having had no one to care for her in the later days, the location of her grave is still unknown. Her fate was often used to scold young Korean women who had literary or artistic ambitions; "Do you want to become another Na Hye-sok?" was a frequent reprimand to daughters and younger sisters. However, she has recently been acknowledged in Korea for her artistic and literary accomplishments. For example, Seoul Arts Center opened a retrospective exhibition of her works in 2000.

Works
 Divorce Testimony
 Go on a Honeymoon: The Tomb of First Love
 Gyunghee
 Jeongsun
 Na Hyeseok jeonjip
 Na Hyeseok's Collected Works
 Self-Portrait (자화상), ca. 1928
 Peonies at Hwaryeongjeon (화령전 작약)
 Paris Landscape
 Dancers (ca. 1927-1928)
 Harbor in Spain
 Beach in Spain
 Scene of Paris (1927-1928)

Artwork 

Although Na Hyeseok is remembered primarily for her literary work on early feminism, she has also impacted modern Korean art through several known pieces that reflect both her beliefs on gender roles as well as her life's trajectory. The most famous of these works is her Self-Portrait (자화상), ca. 1928. It is difficult to find any likeness to Korean or female conformity in Na’s self-portrait. In this oil painting, she emphasizes her identity as a modern, educated, independent woman by wearing modern clothing instead of a traditional Korean hanbok, which was at the time worn as everyday clothing in Korea. Additionally, her hairstyle is also modernized; her hair in the painting has been "styled" into soft waves with two buns in the back, which was a popular feminine hairstyle in the West in the 1920s. Her make-up is also more westernized, with harsh contour, heavy blush, the shape of the eyebrow is arched and shaded darkly with a dark brown to black coloring.

The dark palette of the background blends with Na’s hair and dress to create a flat surface for her face to stand out, drawing viewers’ eyes to her expression. The carved and partially shadowed face, the dark, deep eyes, and the slightly pressed and pursed mouth convey weariness and agony. In addition to these qualities, her large eyes and high nose bridge are reminiscent of western features. The influence of Cubism is clear in the prominent Westernized facial bone structure of the subject; this could imply a preferred appearance or a wish to understand the Western woman’s experience of living in a more progressive society. Despite the fact that she looks both western and modern in terms of appearance and attire, the darkness in this painting's coloring (black, silver, brown, peach) shows how she was still stuck within a society where conservative ideas were holding women back from achieving real and significant social changes.

The depressing look she dons in the painting indicates the hardship of living as a New Woman in a patriarchal and complicated society of early 20th century Korea; her firm, straight gaze points to her conviction in her ideals. She is also gazing somewhere else rather than directly at the viewer, which could represent how the freedom and fluidity in gender roles she was seeking was unable to be found in the conservative society she was living in. 

In 2000, Seoul Arts Center opened a retrospective exhibition of her works, and in 2022, The Los Angeles County Museum of Art (LACMA) displayed this self-portrait as part of its Korean contemporary art exhibition, titled “The Space Between: The Modern in Korean Art." BTS’s RM introduced it along with the nine other pieces through an audio message spoken in both English and Korean, a testament to how influential and respected Na is nowadays for her art.

A similar painting by Na Hyeseok is titled Dancers (ca. 1927-1928) and depicts two apparently western women wearing brown and white fur coats. It is clear that the two women are western or at least meant to portray western women based on their facial features, which are drawn in a similar way to the features that appear on her own self-portrait (e.g. high nose bridges and heavy makeup). This painting evokes an image of luxury and sophistication through the way the women are elegantly posed, indicating that it is unlikely that the fur coats were worn solely out of necessity for the frosty weather. The title of the painting Dancers also adds to this imagery, suggesting that this attire is meant for aesthetic purposes instead. The presentation of the women is associated with Western society and modernity, and this influence from the West is present throughout most of her paintings. The darker color scheme she uses in this painting is similar to that of Self-Portrait (i.e. brown tones) and is used in much of her other work as well, reflecting both the tragic life she lived as well as her mental state at the time. 

Another work of art Na Hyeseok is attributed with is the painting Peonies at Hwaryeongjeon (화령전 작약). Na Hyeseok’s range of topics for her paintings is vast, and these topics range from farm life, nudes, and satires to different types of scenery. This painting was created after she released A Divorce Confession (otherwise known as A Divorce Testimony) in 1934, her extremely controversial piece of writing that criticized gender roles as well as her husband's behavior in their marriage. Although both Na Hyeseok and her husband committed faults in their relationship, Na lost more than her husband and eventually became a social outcast after releasing this work. This painting was made just a year after this incident, reflecting her hope to be free from social restrictions. Na uses the impasto painting technique in this work, which is a style in which visible brushstrokes of thick paint are used to create clear paint streaks on top of the canvas. By doing so, she is able to capture the fleeting moments when the wind blows the peonies to a blur in the foreground. The texture and the appearance of movement in the painting evoke a realistic experience of a windy excursion and the vibrant colors (orange, green, yellow, and white) make the painting appear animated and lively. Both of these qualities are symbolic of the freedom Na seeks as a woman in 20th-century conservative Korean society.

More recently, another landscape painting created by Na has been unveiled. The drawing was found at her nephew Na Sanggyun’s house in Buam-dong, northern Seoul. According to Na Sanggyun, the painting had belonged to the granddaughter of Choi Nam-seon, a renowned writer during the Japanese colonial period. Choi Namseon and Na Hyeseok had been acquaintances ever since they studied together in Japan. She gave the drawing to him, and it had been preserved through three generations. 

The drawing is estimated to have been made in 1928 during Na's stay in Paris as part of her 21-month trip around the world with her husband. The painting is 60 centimeters long (24 inches) and 50 centimeters wide and depicts a typical landscape painting of a French village with surrounding trees and a red-roofed house with white walls. The bold brush strokes in the work simplify the object while also bringing it to life, and elements of Fauvinism and expressionism can also be found in it.

The artwork was recognized by Kim Yi-sun, a professor of Korean modern art at Hongik University, to be from Na's collection book. The piece was confirmed to be hers due to a signature 'HR' found on it that she used regularly in her works as a form of identification.

Some other paintings potentially created by Na during her stay in Europe include Harbor in Spain and Beach in Spain. These pieces differ from Na's Paris landscape painting through the colorful presentation of the scenes depicted, with the varied use of bright colors such as green, orange, brown, blue, and white in the fluid strokes that outline the details of the scenes. Interestingly, Na's Scene of Paris (1927-1928), also created during this time, uses more subdued colors (e.g. brown and grayish tones) that appear to make the scene more depressing and dark. This artistic choice establishes a mood more closely related to that of her Paris landscape painting, which may suggest that Na viewed her time in France differently in comparison to the time she spent in the other European nations, possibly due to her affair in Paris with Choi Rin at the time.

Appreciation
Na Hyeseok's novel Gyunghee (1918) is regarded as a work that shows her distinct femininity. Her novel work was a confession novel. It was also the trend of the novels of the 1920s-1930s. Similar confessionary novels by writers such as Yeom Sang-seop, Kim Dong-in, Kim Iryeop, and Kim Myeong-sun challenged the sexual taboo based on the traditional patriarchal family system.

Works in translation
 "Kyoung-hee" in Questioning Minds: Short Stories By Modern Korean Writers (p. 24)

Legacy
A Google Doodle on 28 April 2019 commemorated the 123rd anniversary of Na Hyeseok’s birth.

See also 

 Hwang Jini
 Uhwudong
 Heo Nanseolheon
 Yu Gam-dong
 Im Yunjidang
 Shin Saimdang
 Park Indeok
 Kim Hwallan
 Kim Jong Suk

References

External links 
 羅蕙錫  
 Creating new paradigms of womanhood in modern Korean literature: Na Hye-sok's "Kyonghui".(Critical Essay) - Korean Studies | HighBeam Research - FREE trial
 Most Feminine and Feminist

20th-century Korean painters
1896 births
1948 deaths
Korean writers
Korean educators
Korean scholars
20th-century Korean women
Free love advocates
Korean feminists
Korean revolutionaries
South Korean journalists
South Korean women journalists
Korean women philosophers
Korean Empire people
20th-century Korean philosophers
Korean women poets
Naju Na clan
20th-century women writers
20th-century journalists
Women painters